Domel, d.o.o. is a global development supplier of electric motors, vacuum motors, blowers and components.

History

Solutions 
Domel is a development leader in the vacuum motor market. Domel creates motors for household and industrial appliances, such as  floor care machines,  gardening equipment and power tools, as well as for HVAC, healthcare and medicine, the alternative energy sector and automotive industry.

Products 
Domel develops and produces universal vacuum motors, brushless DC blowers and brushless DC motors, including permanent magnet synchronous motors.

Domel is a  vertically integrated company, also producing a range of components which are the basis for assembled end-products for Domel and other companies.

Locations 
Domel has manufacturing plants in six locations: four in Slovenia, one in Serbia and one in China.

Environmental practices and initiatives 
Sustainability report: https://www.domel.com/sl/o-nas/druzbena-odgovornost

The official site of the Domel company 
https://www.domel.com/

Manufacturing companies of Slovenia
Municipality of Železniki
1946 establishments in Slovenia